The friendship flight was a singular flight operated by Alaska Airlines in 1988 from Nome, Alaska in the United States to Provideniya in the Soviet Union. There were  about 80 passengers on board.

References

Soviet Union–United States relations
Aviation in Alaska
1988 in international relations
1988 in aviation
1988 in Alaska
1988 in the Soviet Union